Dancing After Hours is a book of short stories by Andre Dubus. First published in 1996 by #knopf, it was one of that year's New York Times Notable Books of the Year.

Contents 
 "The Intruder" — a confused adolescent boy's fantasies bring disaster.
 "A Love Song" — Catherine discovers her husband is having an affair. 
 "Falling In Love" — a Vietnam veteran's love affair ends when his lover seeks an abortion.
 "Blessings" — Rusty deals with the aftermath of a horrific shark attack during a family vacation.
 "Sunday Morning" — a woman whose friend was murdered is convinced that she will never love and be loved.
 "All the Time in the World" — LuAnn Arceneaux meets Ted Briggs and falls in love.
 "Woman on a Plane" — a woman who hates flying travels on a plane to visit her dying brother.
 "The Colonel's Wife" — a veteran depends on his wife for everything after breaking his legs in a freak accident.
 "The Lover" — an aging man has a love affair with a younger woman and feels guilty for his failed marriages.
 "The Last Moon" — a young woman convinces her sixteen-year-old lover to murder her husband.
 "The Timing of Sin" — LuAnn Arceneaux tells her friend Marsha of an occasion when she almost committed adultery.
 "At Night" — an old woman's husband dies in the night beside her.
 "Out of the Snow" — LuAnn Arceneaux beats two home invaders and scares them away.
 "Dancing After Hours" — a quadriplegic's tale of skydiving illuminates an extraordinary evening among a group of people in a bar.

References

External links 
http://www.randomhouse.com/vintage/read/hours/
http://www.medianugget.com/1997/11/dancing_after_h.html
https://www.nytimes.com/1996/04/23/arts/an-award-for-dancing-after-hours.html
http://litmed.med.nyu.edu/Annotation?action=view&annid=1082
http://www.randomhouse.com/catalog/display.pperl?isbn=9780679751144

1996 short story collections
American short story collections
Alfred A. Knopf books